The 2017 Latvian First League (referred to as the komanda.lv Pirmā līga for sponsorship reasons) started on 14 April 2017 and ended on 28 October 2017.

League table

External links 
 The First League on the Latvian Football Federation website
  League321.com - Latvian football league tables, records & statistics database. 

Latvian First League seasons
2
Latvia
Latvia